The Institut industriel du Nord (IDN) was the engineering school and research institute at École Centrale de Lille from 1872 to 1991, within the campus of the Lille University of Science and Technology (France).

History 

École des arts industriels et des mines (École Centrale de Lille) was a college of engineering founded in Lille in 1854 during the Second French Empire. On the eve of the French Third Republic, lectures and research activities were reorganised into a comprehensive three-year curriculum and developed in 1872, embodied by its newly built Institut industriel du Nord de la France (IDN). Education initially focused on civil engineering, mechanical engineering, chemistry and manufacturing engineering.

Electrical engineering full courses were added in 1892, automobile design has been taught from 1899 onwards. More than 200 students graduated in year 1914. Aerodynamics studies started in 1930. A focus on automatic control and computers was initiated in 1957. Later came courses and research in computer science, supply chain management, materials science, micro-electronics and telecommunications.

Since early 20th century, student admission has been based on a competitive exam after attending a classe préparatoire aux grandes écoles or similar undergraduate studies.

The Institut industriel du Nord was originally located in Lille central district until 1875. Larger buildings with dedicated laboratories were inaugurated in 1875 nearby the Faculté des sciences de Lille. It then moved in 1968 in the modern campus of Lille University of Science and Technology, in the south-east suburb of Lille.

See also 
École Centrale de Lille

References 
 
 

 
 

 
 
 Institut industriel du Nord de la France in 

  

Engineering universities and colleges in France
University of Lille Nord de France
Educational buildings in Lille
Defunct schools in France
Villeneuve-d'Ascq
1872 establishments in France
Educational institutions established in 1872